Nicolas Pignatel Jenssen (born 22 January 2002) is a Norwegian football defender who plays for Stabæk.

Hailing from Lommedalen, he started playing for Helset as a child. He joined Stabæk's youth system and signed for the senior team in January 2018. He made his debut in a friendly match the same month. Jenssen, also a staple in Norwegian youth national teams, made his official debut in the 2019 Norwegian Football Cup against Alta, and made his league debut in July 2020 against Strømsgodset.

References

2002 births
Living people
Sportspeople from Bærum
Norwegian people of French descent
Norwegian footballers
Stabæk Fotball players
Eliteserien players
Association football defenders
Norway youth international footballers